Sumanth Art Productions is an Indian film production company in Hyderabad established by M. S. Raju. Successful films like Manasantha Nuvve (2001), Okkadu (2003), Varsham (2004), Nuvvostanante Nenoddantana (2005) were made under this banner. The first film made on the banner was Sathruvu (1991) starring Venkatesh.

Film production

Awards

References

External links
Sumanth Art Productions on Facebook

Film production companies based in Hyderabad, India
Year of establishment missing